Terrace on the Park is a banquet hall in Flushing Meadows–Corona Park in Queens, New York City. The building was constructed by the Port Authority of New York and New Jersey to serve as the heliport for the 1964 New York World's Fair. The building was designed by chief architect Allan Gordon Lorimer, engineers John Kyle and Ray Monte, and planning chief E. Donald Mills.

It is located to the south of the New York Hall of Science. The bulk of the building is suspended in the air by four supports. It has a panoramic view of the Manhattan skyline. The outside walls of the main floor are mostly accessible windows that allow guests a clear view in every direction. Prior to re-opening as a banquet hall, the Beatles' helicopter landed there prior to their Shea Stadium concert in 1965, the venue was used for Park concessions upon the dedication of Flushing Meadows Corona Park in 1967. Following a five-year renovation that was completed in 2017, the venue was brought up to contemporary event standards.

The building is currently owned by the privately held Crystal Ball Group, which operates the building as a catering hall for weddings, proms and other events. The firm pays the New York City Department of Parks and Recreation annually in the amount of 20% of its gross receipts or $2.5 million, whichever is greater.

References

External links

Buildings and structures in Queens, New York
1964 New York World's Fair
World's fair architecture in New York City
Flushing Meadows–Corona Park